Miera may refer to:

 Miera, Spain, a municipality in the Spanish comarca of Trasmiera
Miera River and Miera Valley, Spain - see Valles Pasiegos
 Bernardo de Miera y Pacheco (1713-1785), Spanish cartographer and artist in New Spain
 Ramón Ortiz y Miera (1814-1896), Mexican priest and nationalist
 Rick Miera (born 1951), American politician
 Vicente Miera (born 1940), Spanish retired football defender